Everyday Is Christmas may refer to:
Everyday Is Christmas (album), a 2017 album by Sia
"Everyday Is Christmas", title track from the album by Sia, 2017 
"Everyday Is Christmas" (song), a 2010 song by Jacky Cheung, covered by Earth Wind and Fire 
"Everyday Is Christmas", single by Dominique Rijpma van Hulst 2004, No.4 in the Netherlands
"Everyday Is Christmas", single by Charles Bradley (singer) and The Gospel Queens 2010

See also
"Christmas Everyday", song by Smokey Robinson from Christmas with The Miracles
Christmas Every Day, TV series
"Christmas Every Day!", an episode of The Fairly OddParents; see List of The Fairly OddParents episodes
"I Wish It Could Be Christmas Everyday", 1973 song by Wizzard